Perafort or Perafort i Puigdelfí is a municipality in the province of Tarragona, Catalonia, Spain. The municipality has three exclaves to the west and north-west.

References

External links
 Government data pages 

Municipalities in Tarragonès
Populated places in Tarragonès